Borgne is an arrondissement in the Nord department of Haiti. As of 2015, the population was 116,800 inhabitants. Postal codes in the Borgne Arrondissement start with the number 15.

The arondissement consists of the following municipalities:
 Borgne
 Port-Margot

References

Arrondissements of Haiti
Nord (Haitian department)